Garabet Tavitjan is a Macedonian drummer of Armenian descent who has been a member of the rock group Leb i sol. He is considered the most acclaimed Macedonian drummer.

Discography
 Гаро и Парамециум  Live (МКП, МРТВ 1995)
 Live (SJF Records 1995)
 Гарабет Тавитијан (Gemini 2 1996)
 А бре, Македонче (Matav 2001)

References

External links
Garabet Tavitijan Discography at Discogs

Living people
1953 births
Musicians from Skopje
Progressive rock musicians
Macedonian drummers
Jazz musicians
Macedonian people of Armenian descent